Jurm Aur Sazaa is a 1974 Hindi-language drama film directed by Nisar Ahmad Ansari. It is based on Fyodor Dostoevsky's 1866 novel Crime and Punishment.

Cast
Vinod Mehra as Ratan
Nanda as Ricky
Johnny Walker as Arif
Helen as Cabaret Dancer
Nisar Ahmad Ansari as Sohan

Music
The entire soundtrack is available on Polydor (now Universal Music India).

References

External links
 

1974 films
1970s Hindi-language films
1974 crime drama films
Films scored by Laxmikant–Pyarelal
Indian crime drama films
Films based on Crime and Punishment
Films based on works by Fyodor Dostoyevsky